Trichoura is a genus of robber flies in the family Asilidae discovered by Londt in 1994. There are 7 described species in Trichoura. Species in this genus live  in tropical biomes across the African continent.

Species
These 7 species belong to the genus Trichoura:

 Trichoura krugeri Londt, 1994
 Trichoura mesochora Londt, 1994
 Trichoura pardeos Londt and Dikow, 2016
 Trichoura proctomeces Londt, 1994
 Trichoura tankwa Londt, 1994
 Trichoura torynopoda Londt, 1994
 Trichoura tyligma Londt, 1994

References

Asilidae genera
Asilidae